The Vytebet is a river that flows through the Bryansk, Oryol, and Kaluga Oblasts in Russia.

The Vytebet flows through the Orlovskoye Polesye National Park.

References 

Rivers of Bryansk Oblast
Rivers of Oryol Oblast
Rivers of Kaluga Oblast